The Demon (also known as Midnight Caller) is a 1981 South African slasher film starring Cameron Mitchell and Jennifer Holmes and directed by Percival Rubens. The film was released in 1981.

Plot 
Fourteen-year-old, Emily Parker is kidnapped from her rural home and murdered by a faceless, heavy-breathing maniac with black leather razor-blade tipped gloves. Later, the maniac hitchhikes to the city with a gregarious truck driver. The maniac kills the truck driver, steals his cash, and takes up residence at "Baron Court"- a shady tenement hotel in  Johannesburg's Doornfontein neighborhood.

Two months later, Emily's parents— frustrated by the failure of law enforcement officials to either locate Emily or identify her attacker— enlist the help of Bill Carson, a retired Colonel in the U.S. Marines who now works as a freelance psychic detective. Joan Parker, the distraught mother, needs to know whether Emily is alive or dead- but the angry Mr. Parker is preoccupied with bloody revenge and aggressively implores Col. Carson to find the man responsible. Carson gravely intones that the entity they seek is "an aberration of the species. Something hallucinating evil"— and warns the Parkers that it would be best if they didn't find him.

Meanwhile—for reasons left unclear—the maniac decides to fixate on a young, American pre-school teacher named Mary Jones, who shares a two-story bungalow in Johannesburg's Saxonwold neighborhood with her 18-year-old Afrikaner cousin, Jo.  Mary first sees the elusive maniac lurking outside her classroom —disappearing and re-appearing in the fog—and later, spying on her at the mall.

When not stalking Mary, the maniac holes up in his hotel room—doing push-ups, growling, and tearing up girly magazines.  He also prowls Johannesburg's Hillbrow district at night, attacking various women.

Soon, Jo finds herself embroiled in a hot-and-heavy affair with wealthy American playboy Dean Turner — much to Mary's chagrin.  While Jo is being wined and dined, Mary first finds herself threatened by heavy breathing phone calls — and then by menacing knocks at the door.  Even her neighbor, Dr. Stuart, turns up with his "trusty .38 Special" to have a face-down with the attacker — but by then, he has vanished.  Mary tries to confide in Jo that she feels terrorized, but Jo — distracted by her budding relationship with Dean — dismisses it as Mary's being "all alone in this big house."

Col. Carson continues to assist the Parkers in their search for Emily and the maniac.  Carson produces some crude sketches of the maniac (minus a face), and is able to locate the maniac's hideout.  However, Carson warns Mr. Parker that if he attempts to take justice into his own hands, it will end badly.  Ignoring his warning, the vengeance-obsessed Mr. Parker confronts the maniac at his hotel.  The maniac promptly breaks Mr. Parker's neck, and tosses his lifeless body off a balcony.

Emily's skeleton is finally discovered by children playing in the woods behind her house.  Col. Carson visits a now-hostile Joan Parker to offer condolences for both her daughter and husband —as well as to inform her that, "the time of the Demon, our Demon, is drawing close."  However, the suspicious Joan coldly accuses Col. Carson of masterminding the entire thing—the kidnapping and murder of her daughter, her husband's death—as a way to further perpetuate his own shameless career as a hoax psychic.  Then she shoots him dead square between the eyes.

That night, Mary and Jo go on respective dates with their significant others while the newly christened "Demon" prepares for his final onslaught.  Mary confides to her boyfriend, Bobby, that she has "been on edge lately," menaced by a creep hanging around outside her pre-school classroom, and possibly stalking the house at night.  Bobby agrees to drive her home.  Meanwhile, back at Mary's house, the Demon kills Jo and Dean — and then hides in the house, waiting for Mary to come home.

Mary returns to find the place trashed, and Jo murdered (bruised, bloody, and suffocated by a plastic bag). She runs screaming through the house until she comes face to face with The Demon — who has locked all the doors. She freaks out and a Cat and mouse stalking sequence ensues as the Demon pursues Mary up and downstairs, inside closets, and up to the attic, where she attempts escape through a hole in the roof. When that proves futile, she locks herself in a bathroom—and devises a booby trap to ultimately catch and kill the Demon using a shower nozzle, a bottle of shampoo, and a pair of scissors.

When the Demon bursts through the door, he is hit in the face with a blast of hot water. Mary stabs him in the neck with scissors, and he slips on the shampoo and falls into the bathtub, bleeding to death. Mary takes off screaming through the house just as Bobby and Dr. Stuart arrive to rescue her.

Cast 
Cameron Mitchell as Col. Bill Carson
Jennifer Holmes as Mary Jones
Craig Gardner as Dean Turner
Zoli Marki as Jo
Peter J. Elliot as Mr. Parker
Moira Winsow as Joan Parker
Mark Tanous as Bobby
George Korelin as Dr. Stuart
Vera Blacker as Mrs. Stuart
John Parsonson as The Truck Driver
Graham "Patches" Kennard as The Demon (billed as Graham Kennard)
Diane Burmeister
April Galetti as Girl in Alley
Amanda Wildman

Reception

The Terror Trap  gave the film 2/4 stars, calling it, "utterly boring", criticizing the film's mediocre acting, but commended the film's ending.
Fred Beldin from Allmovie gave the film a negative review, calling it "dull, dimly lit slasher nonsense". Hysteria Lives! awarded the film 2.5 out of 5 stars, writing, "THE DEMON succeeds in being downright freaky. It's not a good film by any means - although, as I pointed out, the final showdown provide some good solid slasher thrills - but, for all its clichés, it goes off at such a tangent that it can't fail but entertain." TV Guide gave the film 2/5 stars, calling it "lame", stating that the film was "of interest only to Cameron Mitchell devotees".

References

External links 
 
 
 

1981 films
1981 horror films
1980s serial killer films
English-language South African films
Films shot in South Africa
South African slasher films
Films set in South Africa
1980s English-language films